is a Japanese anime television series created by White Fox that continues the story of 5pb.'s 2015 video game of the same name, and is part of the Science Adventure franchise. The series is the final iteration of the Steins;Gate 0 story, which explains certain events in the ending of Steins;Gate. It aired from April to September 2018. It is set in an alternative future where the university student Rintaro Okabe, traumatized after his experiences with time travel, meets the neuroscientists Maho Hiyajo and Alexis Leskinen and becomes a tester for their artificial intelligence system Amadeus.

The series was directed by Kenichi Kawamura, and written by Jukki Hanada, who also wrote the original Steins;Gate anime; the voice cast from previous Steins;Gate anime and games also reprised their roles. The series is licensed by Crunchyroll in North America, Madman Entertainment in Australia and Manga Entertainment in the United Kingdom.

Plot

The series is a final iteration of Rintaro Okabe's experiences in the beta world line after the iterations depicted in the Steins;Gate 0 visual novel. It takes place in an alternative world line from the original Steins;Gate where Rintaro Okabe fails to save Kurisu Makise and doesn't receive any guidance from his future self nor encouragement from Mayuri Shiina. After failing to save Kurisu Makise in order to prevent a future war over time machines, Rintaro Okabe, traumatized over his experiences of meddling with the past with his Reading Steiner ability, accepts his life in the beta world line where Kurisu stays dead. After several months have passed, Rintaro meets Maho Hiyajo and Alexis Leskinen, two of Kurisu's former colleagues who have been working on Amadeus, an artificial intelligence system using Kurisu's memories from before her death. Rintaro accepts a request to help out with Amadeus' development by becoming a tester, conversing with the Amadeus Kurisu through his phone.

Cast

Production and release

Steins;Gate 0 was produced by White Fox, and partially adapts the 2015 video game of the same name. The game is a sequel to Steins;Gate, which was also adapted into an anime by White Fox in 2011. While the game's story is composed of multiple routes, the anime reconstructs the story into one single route. The series was directed by Kenichi Kawamura and written by Jukki Hanada, the writer for the Steins;Gate anime, while Tomoshige Inayoshi, an episode animation director for the Steins;Gate anime, adapted Huke's character designs from the game for animation, and Takeshi Kodaka served as art director. The music was composed by Takeshi Abo, Nobuaki Nobusawa, and Moe Hyūga. The voice cast reprised their roles from previous Steins;Gate media. Itō created "Fátima" as a lyrical continuation of "Hacking to the Gate", the opening theme to the first Steins;Gate anime, and said that the fast pace was an important aspect as she wanted the theme to be exhilarating.

The anime was originally announced in March 2015, together with the Steins;Gate 0 game. It was re-revealed with a trailer and key art in July 2017 as part of the "Steins;Gate World Line 2017–2018 Project", which also includes other media based on the Steins;Gate 0 game; at this point, the series had gone into production. The 23-episode series aired in Japan between April 12 and September 27, 2018. It was broadcast on Tokyo MX, TVA, KBS, SUN, TVQ, AT-X, BS11, and GYT, and is streamed through Abema TV in Japan. The series was simulcast by Crunchyroll outside of Asia and Australasia, by AnimeLab in Australia and New Zealand, and by Aniplus Asia in Southeast Asia, and an English dub began streaming through Funimation in the United States, Canada, the United Kingdom, and Ireland on April 30, 2018. Following Sony's acquisition of Crunchyroll, the dub was moved to Crunchyroll.

The series was released across six Blu-ray and DVD volumes in Japan from June 27 to December 21, 2018, of which the last one includes an additional, unaired episode. The English dub was directed by Cris George and written by Jeramey Kraatz. When adapting the series, they encountered a problem they had not dealt with before: In the first episode, Leskinen gives a speech in English, which Maho live interprets in Japanese, and because all characters in the dub speak English they were initially not sure how to portray the situation. They eventually settled on setting the stage by having Maho's dialogue start in Japanese, before switching to English. Ashly Burch, Mayuri's voice actor in the dub, was unable to play the character for the entirety of the simulcast dub due to personal reasons and time constraints; on August 1, 2018, Funimation announced that Megan Shipman would take over the role for the remaining episodes of the simulcast dub, and that they would announce how the role would be handled in the home video release of the series at a later date.

Notes

References

External links
  
 
 

Anime television series based on video games
Crunchyroll anime
Japanese time travel television series
Post-traumatic stress disorder in fiction
Science Adventure
Television series about World War III
Television shows set in Tokyo
Tokyo MX original programming
White Fox